Kirsten Magasdi is a BBC World reporter often seen reporting for Fast Track. Kirsten Magasdi is the presenter of a global television campaign Malaysia Truly Asia for Tourism Malaysia on BBC World.

External links
BBC World Profile

RMIT University alumni
Malaysian journalists
Malaysian women journalists
Living people
Year of birth missing (living people)
Place of birth missing (living people)